Aleksandr Vasilyevich Kobenko (born 23 August 1977) is a former Russian football player.

He is the older brother of Andrei Kobenko.

External links
 

1977 births
People from Maykop
Living people
Association football midfielders
Russian footballers
FC Chernomorets Novorossiysk players
FC Rostov players
Russian Premier League players
FC Slavia Mozyr players
Russian expatriate footballers
Expatriate footballers in Belarus
FC Slavyansk Slavyansk-na-Kubani players
FC Taganrog players
Sportspeople from Adygea